Grevillea confertifolia, commonly known as Grampians grevillea or dense-leaf grevillea, is a species of flowering plant in the family Proteaceae and is endemic to the Grampians in Victoria, Australia. It is a spreading, often dense shrub with linear to narrowly oblong leaves, and reddish-purple flowers.

Description

Taxonomy
Grevillea confertifolia was first formally described in 1854 by Ferdinand von Mueller in Transactions of the Philosophical Society of Victoria from specimens collected between the summit of Mount William and rocky ridges towards Mount Zero. The specific epithet (confertifolia) means "crowded-leaved".

Distribution and habitat
Grampians grevillea grows on rocky sites in woodland, or the shrub layer near streams, and is endemic to the Grampians Range in Victoria.

Conservation status
This grevillea is listed as "rare" in the Victorian Government Department of Environment and Primary Industries "List of rare or threatened plants in Victoria - 2014".

Use in horticulture
Grevillea confertifolia is commercially available, can be grown in a variety of soil types, is frost-tolerant and drought-tolerant when established. It can be propagated seed or from semi-hardwood cuttings using rooting hormone solution.

References

External links
Herbarium specimen at Royal Botanic Gardens Kew

confertifolia
Flora of Victoria (Australia)
Grampians (national park)
Proteales of Australia
Taxa named by Ferdinand von Mueller
Plants described in 1854